Horacio Raúl "Pepa" Baldessari (born 21 November 1958 in Córdoba) is a former Argentine football striker who played professionally in Argentina, Bolivia and Peru during the late 1970s, 1980s and early 1990s. He also managed some clubs after his retirement, but currently works as a football analyst.

Club career
He began his career in 1975 with modest club Sportivo Belgrano, but joined Belgrano de Córdoba the following season. In 1978, he went abroad to play for Bolivian side Blooming. Years later he would also play for Oriente Petrolero, Bolívar and Destroyers. During his spell in the Bolivian league, he scored a total of 161 goals, placing his name eight in the list of all-time topscorers. Even though Baldessari became a naturalized Bolivian, he was never considered as an option for the national team. In 1988, he returned to Argentina and played for his beloved Belgrano de Córdoba once again. By 1990, he transferred to Peruvian side Deportivo Municipal before signing with popular team Sporting Cristal the following year. At first he was heavily questioned by club fans and the media about his age; nonetheless, La Pepa proved them wrong and finished the season as the topscorer that year with 25 goals, and consequently helped Cristal win the 1991 Peruvian title. Baldessari always admitted having spent the best years of his career playing for the cerveceros because he received so many affections that made him feel like at home. After his retirement in 1993, Baldessari settled in Lima, and became a football analyst for several television and radio networks.

Club titles

Honours

References
Dos viejos conocidos y queridos at [dechalaca.com]
Raúl Horacio Baldessari: "La Pepa" remueve el pasado at [eldeber.com.bo]
Bolivian league topscorers at RSSSF

1958 births
Living people
Sportspeople from Córdoba Province, Argentina
Argentine people of Italian descent
Association football forwards
Argentine footballers
Bolivian Primera División players
Peruvian Primera División players
Club Atlético Belgrano footballers
Racing de Córdoba footballers
Club Blooming players
Oriente Petrolero players
Argentine expatriate sportspeople in Peru
Club Bolívar players
Club Destroyers players
Sporting Cristal footballers
Argentine expatriate footballers
Expatriate footballers in Bolivia
Expatriate footballers in Peru
Argentine expatriate sportspeople in Bolivia
Juan Aurich managers
León de Huánuco managers
Deportivo Municipal managers
Argentine football managers
Carlos A. Mannucci managers